Pomatiopsidae is a family of small, mainly freshwater snails, (some also occur in other habitats) that have gills and an operculum, aquatic gastropod mollusks in the superfamily Truncatelloidea (according to the taxonomy of the Gastropoda by Bouchet & Rocroi, 2005).

Pomatiopsidae are well known as intermediate hosts of Asian schistosomes.

Distribution 
Species in the family Pomatiopsidae occur worldwide. The generic diversity of Pomatiopsinae is particularly high in the Japanese Archipelago, where four of the eight genera, including two endemics, are recorded. The subfamily Triculinae radiated as aquatic snails in freshwater habitats in Southeast Asia.

Description
The American malacologist William Stimpson first defined this taxon as Pomatiopsinae in 1865. Stimpson's diagnosis reads as follows:

Subfamilies
The family Pomatiopsidae consists of 2 subfamilies (according to the taxonomy of the Gastropoda by Bouchet & Rocroi, 2005) that follows classification by Davis (1979):
 Subfamily Pomatiopsinae Stimpson, 1865 - synonyms: Hemibiinae Heude, 1890; Tomichiinae Wenz, 1938; Coxiellidae Iredale, 1943; Oncomelaniidae Salisbury & Edwards, 1961; Cecininae Starobogatov, 1983
 Subfamily Triculinae Annandale, 1924
 tribe Triculuni Annandale, 1924 - synonym: Delavayidae Annandale, 1924
 tribe Jullieniini Davis, 1979
 tribe Lacunopsini Davis, 1979
 tribe Pachydrobiini Davis & Kang, 1990

Family-group name Rehderiellinae Brandt, 1974 is also in Pomatiopsidae, but it is not allocated in detail.

Genera 
Genera within the family Pomatiopsidae include:

 Spiripockia Simone, 2012 (not allocated to a subfamily)

Subfamily Pomatiopsinae
 Blanfordia Adams, 1863
 Cecina A. Adams, 1861
 Coxiella E. A. Smith, 1894: belongs in the family Tomichiidae 
 Floridiscrobs Pilsbry and McGinty, 1949   
 Fukuia Abbott & Hunter, 1949
 Hemibia Heude, 1890 (species type: Oncomelania hupensis Gredler, 1881
 Idiopyrgus Pilsbry, 1911 - synonym: Aquidauania Davis, 1979: belongs in the family Tomichiidae 
 Oncomelania Gredler, 1881
 Pomatiopsis Tryon, 1862 - the type genus of the family Pomatiopsidae
 Tomichia Benson, 1851: belongs in the family Tomichiidae 

Subfamily Triculinae - there are over 20 genera in Triculinae

tribe Triculuni
 Delavaya Heude, 1889
 Fenouilia Heude, 1889
 Lithoglyphopsis Thiele, 1928
 Tricula Benson, 1843 - type genus of the tribe Triculuni

tribe Jullieniini
 Hubendickia Brandt, 1968
 Hydrorissoia Bavay, 1895
 Jullienia Crosse & P. Fischer, 1876 - type genus of the tribe Jullieniini
 Karelainia Davis, 1979
 Kunmingia Davis & Kuo in Davis, 1981
 Neoprososthenia Davis & Kuo in Davis, Kuo, Hoagland, Chen, Yang & Chen, 1984
 Pachydrobiella Thiele, 1928 - with the only species Pachydrobiella brevis (Bavay, 1895)
 † Paraprososthenia Annandale, 1919
 Saduniella Brandt, 1970 - with the only species Saduniella planispira Brandt, 1970

tribe Lacunopsini
 Lacunopsis Deshayes, 1876 - type genus of the tribe Lacunopsini

tribe Pachydrobiini
 Gammatricula Davis & Liu in Davis, Liu & Chen, 1990
 Halewisia Davis, 1979 - with the only species Halewisia expansa (Brandt, 1970)
 Jinghongia Davis in Davis & Kang, 1990
 Neotricula Davis in Davis, Subba Rao & Hoagland, 1986
 Pachydrobia Crosse & P. Fischer, 1876 - type genus of the tribe Pachydrobiini
 Robertsiella 	Davis & Greer, 1980
 Wuconchona Kang, 1983

Rehderiellinae is not allocated to a subfamily
 Rehderiella Brandt, 1974 - type genus of the taxon Rehderiellinae

Ecology 
The Pomatiopsidae have various life habits: aquatic, amphibious, littoral, halophilic, cavernicolous and even terrestrial. Terrestrial taxa occur only on the Japanese Archipelago located in East Asia (Blanfordia). Tomichia and Coxiella include several halophilic species occurring on saline lakes.

Pomatiopsidae invaded freshwater habitats from marine ones in one or in two independent lineages. They also invaded terrestrial habitats from freshwater habitats in two independent lineages.

References
This article incorporates public domain text from the reference and CC-BY-2.0 from the reference

External links 

 Stimpson W. (1865). "Researches upon the Hydrobiinae and allied forms chiefly made upon materials in the museum of the Smithsonian Institution". Smithsonian Miscellaneous Collections 7(201): 1-59. page 4
 Davis G. M., Chen C.-E., Wu C., Kuang T.-F., Xing X.-G., Li L., Liu W.-J. & Yan Y.-L. (1992). "The Pomatiopsidae of Hunan, China (Gastropoda, Rissoacea)". Malacologia 34(1-2): 143-342.